John Bowab (born October 22, 1933) is an American director and producer of television and theatre.

Career 
Bowab began his career in theatre, directing a number of stage productions, such as Mame (1983), The Night of the Hunter (2003), and most recently 70, Girls, 70 (2010).

In the late 1970s, he moved on to television, amassing a number of directing credits. Some of these include The Cosby Show, Benson, Bosom Buddies, Gimme a Break!, Small Wonder, Making a Living, Full House, Who's the Boss?, The Facts of Life, Family Matters, Double Trouble, Too Close for Comfort, Ellen, among other series.

References

External links

1933 births
American television directors
American television producers
American theatre directors
Living people
Place of birth missing (living people)
American people of Lebanese descent